The TT Pro League Golden Boot is an annual Trinidad and Tobago football award given at the beginning of each TT Pro League calendar year to the top goalscorer for the previous season. The Golden Boot has been awarded since the establishment of the Pro League in 1999. The top-scoring Pro League Golden Boot winner is Arnold Dwarika with 45 goals in 28 games during the league's inaugural season. Devorn Jorsling has won the award the most times (4) having scored the most league goals during the 2008, 2010–11, 2012–13, and 2014–15 seasons, all when playing for the Teteron Boys of Defence Force. Jorsling remains the only player to have won the Golden Boot on more than one occasion with his most successful campaigns in 2008, 2012–13, and 2014–15 after leading the league with 21 goals each season.

There have been 15 players from eight different clubs that have won the Golden Boot. The award has gone to a single player each season, with the exception of two seasons. The first occurrence came in 2005, after W Connection's Gefferson and Earl Jean shared the award with 14 goals each. After scoring 16 goals apiece, Roen Nelson of Joe Public shared the award with San Juan Jabloteh's Anthony Wolfe the following season. The Golden Boot winner has played for Defence Force during their award-winning season six times, which is the most of any club in the TT Pro League. Joe Public and San Juan Jabloteh are second with three players each claiming the Golden Boot.

Players from five nations, other than Trinidad and Tobago, have won the Golden Boot including Guyana (Randolph Jerome, 2003–04), Brazil (Gefferson, 2005), Saint Lucia (Earl Jean, 2005), Jamaica (Roen Nelson, 2006), and Antigua and Barbuda (Peter Byers, 2007). Although there has been an increasing presence of foreign players in the Pro League, there has not been a foreign-born player to win the Golden Boot since 2008. Since the 2009 season, Trinidad and Tobago international players Kerry Baptiste, Marcus Joseph, Devorn Jorsling, and Richard Roy have won the award.

Although Arnold Dwarika has the highest number of goals scored to win the Golden Boot with 45, Jerren Nixon has the highest strike rate of 1.76 (37 goals in 21 games) in winning the Golden Boot during North East Stars' championship winning season in 2004. Every winner of the Golden Boot has thus far recorded an average strike rate of at least two goals every three matches, and scored a minimum of 14 goals. In fact, combining the statistics for all winners, a Pro League Golden Boot winner scores an average of 20 goals from 24 games, a strike rate of around 0.83 goals per appearance. The Golden Boot winner has helped his respective team to the TT Pro League championship eight years during the award-winning season.

Winners

Multiple winners
Devorn Jorsling is currently the only player who has been able to win the TT Pro League Golden Boot multiple times with four. Thus, he became the first to win four Golden Boots in 2008, 2010–11, 2012–13, and 2014–15. No player has won the award in consecutive years.

See also
 TT Pro League awards
 Top TT Pro League goal scorers by season
 List of TT Pro League seasons

References

Gold
TT Pro League
Trinidaa
Association football player non-biographical articles